Vadim Shikarev (15 November 1968 – February 2001) was a Kazakhstani archer. He competed at the 1992 Summer Olympics, the 1996 Summer Olympics and the 2000 Summer Olympics.

References

External links
 

1968 births
2001 deaths
Kazakhstani male archers
Olympic archers of the Unified Team
Olympic archers of Kazakhstan
Archers at the 1992 Summer Olympics
Archers at the 1996 Summer Olympics
Archers at the 2000 Summer Olympics
Asian Games medalists in archery
Archers at the 1994 Asian Games
Archers at the 1998 Asian Games
Asian Games bronze medalists for Kazakhstan
Medalists at the 1994 Asian Games
20th-century Kazakhstani people